Return to Japan is the second live album by symphonic rock vocalist, Lana Lane, released in 2004. The album is Lane's 10th album release overall (by U.S. release only), while also being her 15th album over (by Japanese release). Unlike Lane's first live album, Live in Japan, this album was not only released in Japan, but was also released in the U.S.

The album spans over two discs, featuring live concerts Lana has performed from 1998–2002.

NOTE: The first 4 tracks featured on Disc One are actually one performance, as those 4 songs are performed as a medley.

Track listing

Disc one

Disc Two

References

2004 albums
Lana Lane albums